Francisco Evanilson de Lima Barbosa (born 6 October 1999), commonly known as Evanilson, is a Brazilian professional footballer who plays as a forward for Primeira Liga club Porto.

Evanilson is a product of Fluminense's youth system and made his senior debut for the club in January 2018. He spent time on loan at Slovakian club Šamorín in the 2017–18 season. In 2020, he joined Tombense but was immediately loaned back to Fluminense. Later that year he moved to Porto after making 26 appearances in total for Fluminense. With Porto, he won the domestic double of the Primeira Liga and the Taça de Portugal in the 2021–22 season.

Evanilson has represented Brazil at under-23 level.

Club career

Fluminense
Born in Fortaleza, Evanilson joined Fluminense's youth setup in 2013, from local side Estação. He made his first team debut on 17 January 2018, coming on as a second-half substitute for Dudu in a 3–1 Campeonato Carioca away loss against Boavista; he also gave away a penalty in that match.

On 23 January 2018, Evanilson was sent to a six-month loan to Fluminense's farm team affiliate Šamorín in Slovakia's 2. Liga. He made his debut abroad on 14 April, replacing Roman Sabler in a 1–0 home win against Partizán Bardejov. Fourteen days later, Evanilson scored his first senior goal, netting the opener in a 2–0 away win over Spišská Nová Ves, before returning to Fluminense in May after contributing with three goals in six appearances.

Upon returning to Fluminense, Evanilson was assigned back at the under-20 squad. In September 2019, after being the top goalscorer of the Campeonato Brasileiro Sub-20 with 11 goals, he was promoted to the main squad. After standing out in Flus youth sides, he quickly rose to the first team, but fell out of favor within the club, after not being sought as one of the biggest recent promises from Flu youth sides.

Evanilson made his Série A debut on 7 November 2019, replacing fellow youth graduate Marcos Paulo in a 2–0 away win against São Paulo. On 8 December, in his first start for the club, he scored a brace in a 2–1 away defeat of Corinthians.

On 13 December 2019, Evanilson signed a pre-contract with Tombense, effective as of February. The following 15 January, Fluminense announced he would remain at the club on loan until December 2021. Evanilson became a regular starter for Flu in the 2020 campaign, partnering with Marcos Paulo up front.

 Porto 
On 7 September 2020, Evanilson signed a five-year contract with Portuguese club Porto, in a transfer worth €8,8 million, with Fluminense receiving 30% of the fee which should be paid to Tombense, plus a 6% profit on a future sale. He made his debut for the club on 24 October, scoring the winning goal in a 1–0 home win against Gil Vicente in the Primeira Liga. The following months, after finding limited first team opportunities, Evanilson dropped into Porto's reserve team in LigaPro, in order to earn a place in the first team under manager Sérgio Conceição, following an advice from team-mate Otávio.

After scoring six goals in five matches for Porto's B team, Evanilson began earning a spot in the first team on 30 October 2021, scoring a brace in a 4–1 home win against local rivals Boavista in the Derby da Invicta. On 23 December, Evanilson scored a brace in a 3–0 win over rivals Benfica in the Taça de Portugal, before being sent off in the process, which forced him to miss the following match against the same opposition in the Primeira Liga.

On 16 January 2022, he scored his first hat-trick in the league in a 4–1 away win over B SAD, doubling his last season's record of ten goals. On 30 January, he scored a backheel goal in a 2–1 home win against Marítimo, earning him the Primeira Liga Goal of the Month award. His performances led to him being also named the league's Forward of the Month for January. On 6 March, Evanilson scored a goal and provided an assist to help his team come from behind in the first leg of Porto's semifinal match in the Taça de Portugal in a 2–1 away win against rivals Sporting CP to become the first Porto player since the 1997–98 season after Mário Jardel to score six or more goals for the club in the competition.

He would contribute to 46 appearances, scoring 21 goals, to help Porto win the domestic double of the Primeira Liga and the Taça de Portugal, while also finishing as the top scorer of the latter competition with 7 goals. On 30 July, Evanilson scored and provided an assist in the 3–0 defeat of Tondela in the Supertaça Cândido de Oliveira.

International career
Evanilson has made two appearances for Brazil at under-23 level, in friendlies against South Korea and Egypt in November 2020.

Career statistics
Club

HonoursPortoPrimeira Liga: 2021–22
Taça de Portugal: 2021–22
Supertaça Cândido de Oliveira: 2022Individual'
Primeira Liga's Forward of the Month: January 2022
Primeira Liga's Goal of the Month: January 2022
Taça de Portugal Top scorer: 2021–22 (7 goals)

References

External links
Profile at the FC Porto website

1999 births
Living people
People from Fortaleza
Brazilian footballers
Association football forwards
Campeonato Brasileiro Série A players
Fluminense FC players
Tombense Futebol Clube players
2. Liga (Slovakia) players
FC ŠTK 1914 Šamorín players
Primeira Liga players
FC Porto players
Brazilian expatriate footballers
Brazilian expatriate sportspeople in Slovakia
Brazilian expatriate sportspeople in Portugal
Expatriate footballers in Slovakia
Expatriate footballers in Portugal
Sportspeople from Ceará